TSS Snaefell V - the fifth ship in the Company's history to bear the name - was a passenger vessel operated by the Isle of Man Steam Packet Company from 1948 to 1978. Her purchase cost was £504,448.

Dimensions
Snaefell had a registered tonnage of 2489 GRT, but otherwise her dimensions, speed, horsepower and crew accommodation were similar to her three predecessors; Tynwald, Mona's Queen and King Orry.

History

She was built at Cammell Laird, as the fourth of six ships - the six sisters - delivered by the company between 1946 and 1955 at a cost of £504,448 (equivalent to £ as of ),. Snaefell was launched by Mrs J. R. Quayle on Thursday, 11 March 1948. Upon her completion she underwent her sea trials on 19 & 20 July of that year, and made her maiden voyage from Liverpool to Douglas on 24 July.

Service life
Snaefell and her younger sister Mona's Isle were the last ships on the Company's Heysham-Douglas service when it closed towards the end of August 1974.

Apart from an accident when she fouled her anchor off Llandudno in July 1976 and consequently missed a sailing, Snaefell enjoyed an efficient and uneventful career.

However, the predominance built up by the Steam Packet's car ferries in the 1970s, made it sensible to withdraw another traditionally designed ship.

Disposal
Snaefell made her final sailing from Douglas on August Bank Holiday Monday, 1977, and was then laid up in Bidston Dock, Birkenhead.
Following her withdrawal from service, she was sold to the Rochdale Metal Recovery Co. for scrap in 1978, and in November of that year, she was taken under tow to Blyth for breaking up.

Trivia
The ship's bell from the Snaefell was salvaged by a former member of her ship's company upon whose death it was passed down to his son who retains it as part of a private collection in St John's, Isle of Man.

Six of Snaefell's beautiful portholes were also salvaged and to this day they live on in a 1937 River Thames tug called 'Swallow'. These large bronze portholes were fitted into Swallow during her refurbishment during 1979 as a replacement to her smaller portholes. Swallow is registered on the National Historic Ships Record.
www.swallowthamestug.co.uk

Gallery

References

1948 ships
Ships of the Isle of Man Steam Packet Company
Passenger ships of the United Kingdom
Ferries of the Isle of Man
Steamships
Ships built on the River Mersey